Great Escape or The Great Escape may refer to:

History
In chronological order
 The great Carson City prison escape (September 17, 1871), the prison break from Nevada State Prison
 Stalag Luft III escape (1944), known as the "Great Escape", a World War II mass escape from the German prisoner-of-war camp Stalag Luft III
 June 1962 Alcatraz escape, sometimes referred to as "The Great Escape"
 Maze Prison escape (1983), known to Irish Republicans as the "Great Escape"

Arts, entertainment, and media

Film and TV
 The Great Escape (film), a 1963 film based on Paul Brickhill's 1950 book of the same name

TV series
 The Great Escape (American TV series), a 2012 reality series
 The Great Escape (Irish TV series), a 2006–2009 documentary series
 Great Escape (South Korean TV series), a 2018–2021 reality series

TV episodes
 "The Great Escape" (Monster Allergy episode)
 "The Great Escape", an episode of Aaahh!!! Real Monsters
 "The Great Escape", an episode of Married... with Children
 "The Great Escape", an episode of Tanner '88
 "The Great Escape", an episode of The Life and Times of Juniper Lee
 "The Great Escape!", an episode of The Raccoons

Literature
 The Great Escape (book), a 1950 book by Paul Brickhill describing the 1944 Stalag Luft III escape
 The Great Escape: Or, The Sewer Story (1973), a children's story about sewer alligators by Peter Lippman (Golden Press)
 The Great Escape: Health, Wealth, and the Origins of Inequality (2013), a non-fiction book by Angus Deaton

Music

Albums
 Great Escape (Tara Blaise album), or the title song
 The Great Escape (Blur album), 1995
 The Great Escape (EP), by Morning Runner, or the title song (see below)
 The Great Escape (Ilse DeLange album), or the title song
 The Great Escape (Richard Clapton album), 1982
 The Great Escape (Seventh Wonder album), 2010
 Great Escape (The Rifles album), or the title song

Songs
 "Great Escape" (Cinema Staff song), 2013
 "Great Escape", by Guster from Goldfly, 1997
 "Great Escape", by Moby from 18, 2002
 "Great Escape", by Tini from Tini, 2016
 "The Great Escape" (Boys Like Girls song), 2007
 "The Great Escape", by Blanco and Central Cee, 2021
 "The Great Escape", by BT from Emotional Technology, 2003
 "The Great Escape", by Dala from Best Day, 2012
 "The Great Escape", by Girls' Generation from Girls' Generation, 2011
 "The Great Escape", by Marillion from Brave, 1994
 "The Great Escape", by Morning Runner from Wilderness Is Paradise Now, 2006
 "The Great Escape", by Nelson from Because They Can, 1995
 "The Great Escape", by P!nk from The Truth About Love, 2012
 "The Great Escape", by Patrick Watson from Close to Paradise, 2006
 "The Great Escape", by We Are Scientists from With Love and Squalor, 2005
 "The Great Escape", by Woodkid from The Golden Age, 2013

Other uses in music
 The Great Escape (festival), an Australian music festival
 The Great Escape Festival, a music festival in Brighton, England
 The Great Escape Tour, 2015 tour by Australian rapper Iggy Azalea

Video games
 Great Escape (1983 video game), a game for the Atari 2600
 The Great Escape (1986 video game), a game which shares a title and similar plot to the movie
 The Great Escape (2003 video game), a game based on the film
 Rayman 2: The Great Escape, a 1999 platforming video game and the sequel to Rayman
 Great Escape!, the in-game title of Monty Is Innocent, a 1985 game for the ZX Spectrum

Sport
 "The Great Escape", West Bromwich Albion's escape from relegation during the FA Premier League 2004–2005 season
 "The Great Escape", Salford City's escape from relegation during the Northern Premier League 2008–2009 season

Other uses
 Six Flags Great Escape and Hurricane Harbor, an amusement park and outdoor water park in Queensbury, New York, U.S.
 Six Flags Great Escape Lodge & Indoor Waterpark, a resort and indoor water park in Queensbury, New York, U.S.
 Great Escape Theatres, a movie theatre chain primarily in the Midwestern U.S.
 The Great Escape, a former amusement park in Hillarys Boat Harbour, Perth, Australia

See also
The Grape Escape, board game originally released in 1992